Omar Bienvenido Borrás Granda (15 June 1929 – 19 October 2022) was a Uruguayan football manager.

Career
Borrás was assistant manager to Ondino Viera while Uruguay national team played the 1966 FIFA World Cup in England.

As manager of Montevideo Wanderers he achieved qualification to the 1975 Copa Libertadores.

He first managed the Uruguay in 1977 on an interim basis.

Borrás was appointed Uruguay national team manager for a second time in 1982. He guided Uruguay to their victory at the 1983 Copa América. He was also the coach of Uruguay at the 1986 FIFA World Cup. During that tournament, he was banned from the sidelines for their second round match against Argentina due to Uruguay's rough play for their previous game against Scotland, and also his remarks towards the referee after the match. When he left his post in 1986, he had managed 54 matches, the second most of all Uruguay managers behind Óscar Tabárez as of 2022.

It is believed that he was the first person to use the term the "Group of Death", to describe their first round group with West Germany, Denmark and Scotland.

Death
Borrás died on 19 October 2022, aged 93, due to kidney problems.

References

External links
 Profile at Uruguayan Football Association
 

1929 births
2022 deaths
Uruguayan football managers
1983 Copa América managers
1986 FIFA World Cup managers
Huracán Buceo managers
Montevideo Wanderers managers
Central Español managers
Uruguay national football team managers
Al Hilal SFC managers
Saudi Arabia national football team managers
Uruguayan expatriate sportspeople in Saudi Arabia
Expatriate football managers in Saudi Arabia
Uruguayan expatriate sportspeople in Qatar
Expatriate football managers in Qatar
Uruguayan expatriate sportspeople in the United Arab Emirates
Expatriate football managers in the United Arab Emirates
Uruguayan expatriate sportspeople in Oman
Expatriate football managers in Oman